This is a list of indoor arenas in Africa with seating capacities of at least of 2,000.

Current Arenas

Future Arenas

See also
List of stadiums by capacity
List of football (soccer) stadiums by capacity
List of indoor arenas by capacity
List of indoor arenas in Europe

References

External links
Sports venues in Africa

Africa
Africa
Africa-related lists